Mohammad Nawaz (Urdu,; born 21 March 1994) is a Pakistani cricketer. In August 2018, he was one of thirty-three players to be awarded a central contract for the 2018–19 season by the Pakistan Cricket Board (PCB).

Personal life
Mohammad Nawaz was born in Rawalpindi into a Pashtun family, originally belonging to Akbarpura, a village northwest of Peshawar, as he declared in a Youtube video. 

In 2018, he married Izdihaar, a South African diagnostic radiographer of Saudi Arabian descent.

Domestic and T20 franchise career
He was bought by Quetta Gladiators for the 2016 Pakistan Super League (PSL). In his debut match for the franchise against Islamabad United he took 4 wickets for 13 runs in 4 overs. He finished the tournament as the fourth leading wicket-taker. His performance in the initial phase of the PSL resulted in a call-up to Pakistan's 2016 ICC World Twenty20 squad.
 
Due to his performance in 2016 season, he was retained by the team for 2017 season. He finished the season with 10 wickets in the 10 matches he played.

In April 2018, he was named as the vice-captain of Baluchistan's squad for the 2018 Pakistan Cup. He took the most wickets for Baluchistan during the tournament, with nine dismissals in four matches.

In September 2018, he was named in Balkh's squad in the first edition of the Afghanistan Premier League tournament. In March 2019, he was named in Federal Areas' squad for the 2019 Pakistan Cup. In June 2019, he was selected to play for the Edmonton Royals franchise team in the 2019 Global T20 Canada tournament. In July 2019, he was selected to play for the Belfast Titans in the inaugural edition of the Euro T20 Slam cricket tournament. However, the following month the tournament was cancelled.

In September 2019, he was named in the squad for the Cape Town Blitz team for the 2019 Mzansi Super League tournament. In the same month, he was also named in Northern's squad for the 2019–20 Quaid-e-Azam Trophy tournament. In November 2019, he was selected to play for the Rajshahi Royals in the 2019–20 Bangladesh Premier League.

In January 2021, he was named as the captain of Northern for the 2020–21 Pakistan Cup.

International career
He made his Twenty20 International debut for Pakistan against the United Arab Emirates in the 2016 Asia Cup on 29 February 2016. He was hit for 38 runs from 3 overs after being called to bowl by captain Shahid Afridi. Waqar Younis, the head coach, criticised Afridi for this and said that it was 'unfair' for him to call Nawaz up being relatively new and that it 'destroyed the youngster's confidence'.

He made his One Day International debut for Pakistan against Ireland on 18 August 2016, scoring a half-century. In September 2016, he was named man of the match in the final of the 2016–17 National T20 Cup.

He made his Test debut for Pakistan against the West Indies in Dubai on 13 October 2016.

In June 2020, he was named as one of four reserve players for Pakistan's tour to England during the COVID-19 pandemic. In September 2021, he was named in Pakistan's squad for the 2021 ICC Men's T20 World Cup.

In July 2022, in the first match against Sri Lanka, he took his first five-wicket haul in Test cricket.

In September 2022, he was instrumental in a record win against India during the Asia Cup, being Pakistan's highest successful  run-chase against India in a T20I, eventually named man of the match for his all-round contributions.

References

External links
 

1994 births
Living people
Cricketers from Rawalpindi
Pakistani cricketers
Pakistan Test cricketers
Pakistan One Day International cricketers
Pakistan Twenty20 International cricketers
Balochistan cricketers
Cape Town Blitz cricketers
Federal Areas cricketers
Karachi Blues cricketers
National Bank of Pakistan cricketers
Rajshahi Royals cricketers
Rangpur Riders cricketers
Rawalpindi cricketers
Rawalpindi Rams cricketers
Quetta Gladiators cricketers
Sindh cricketers
Sylhet Strikers cricketers
United Bank Limited cricketers